Deadspin is a sports blog founded by Will Leitch in 2005 and based in Chicago. Previously owned by Gawker Media and Univision Communications, it is currently owned by G/O Media.

Deadspin posted daily previews, recaps, and commentaries of major sports stories, as well as sports-related anecdotes, rumors, and videos. In addition to covering sports, the site wrote about the media, pop culture, and politics, and published several non-sports sub-sections, including The Concourse and the humor blog Adequate Man. Contrasting with traditional sports updates of other outlets, Deadspin was known for its irreverent, conversational tone, often injecting crude humor into its writing and taking a critical lens to the topics it covered. Over time, the site expanded into more investigative journalism and broke several stories, including the revelation of the Manti Te'o girlfriend hoax. Alumni writers of Deadspin have gone on to work for The New York Times, The Washington Post, and Sports Illustrated.

During October and November 2019, the website's entire writing and editorial staff resigned due to conflicts with G/O Media management over a directive to "stick to sports" content only.  Deadspin began publishing content again in March 2020. The site has suffered after the mass resignations, reportedly attracting only 10.22% of its previous readership.

History
Deadspin was founded in December 2005 by editor-in-chief Will Leitch, an author and at that time a founding editor of the New York City-based culture website, "The Black Table", in his New York City apartment, where he wrote 40 blog posts a day.  The blog joined the Gawker Media network of websites. Leitch announced on June 5, 2008, that he would be leaving to take a position at New York magazine. He was replaced by A. J. Daulerio, former senior writer for the site. Author and journalist Drew Magary, formerly a frequent contributor to the site's comments section, joined as an editor and chief columnist in 2008.

Time magazine named the site one of the 50 coolest websites of 2006.

Deadspin was one of six websites that were purchased by Univision Communications in their acquisition of Gawker Media in August 2016. The Gizmodo Media Group was subsequently formed to operate the properties.

The website's masthead consisted of editor-in-chief Megan Greenwell, managing editor Tom Ley, and senior editor Diana Moskovitz, along with a staff of full-time writers and regular contributors.

Conflicts with G/O Media management
In April 2019, the Gizmodo Media Group was purchased by private equity firm Great Hill Partners and was renamed G/O Media, with Jim Spanfeller appointed as CEO. Greenwell resigned from Deadspin effective August 23, 2019. She cited dysfunction caused by corporate management, attempts by them to intimidate writers out of reporting on it, and undermining and condescending to the site's senior staff.

In late October 2019, the editorial staff across several G/O Media sites, including Deadspin, posted articles acknowledging complaints from readers about advertisements that were autoplaying with audio. The Deadspin post said that the editorial staff "are as upset with the current state of our site's user experience as [readers] are" but that they could not control the "ad experience". The posts were subsequently removed by G/O Media management. The Gizmodo Media Group (GMG) union, which represents editors and writers across the G/O Media sites and is supported by Writers Guild of America, East, responded to the post removals with a statement that said, "We condemn this action in the strongest possible terms." According to The Wall Street Journal, G/O Media enabled the autoplaying ads in an attempt to fulfill the terms of an advertising deal it agreed to with Farmers Insurance Group. The companies had signed a deal worth $1 million that was planned to run from September 2019 – 2020 and required G/O Media to deliver 43.5 million impressions. However, after the first few weeks of the campaign, the G/O media and operations teams did not think they could meet that goal and subsequently enabled the ads. Farmers ultimately backed out of the deal on October 30.

That same week, G/O Media editorial director Paul Maidment sent a memo to Deadspin employees ordering them to discontinue any content not related to sports. He said that in order to "create as much great sports journalism" as possible, "Deadspin will write only about sports and that which is relevant to sports in some way." The GMG union called the changes in the site's content "undermin[ing] the nearly two decades of work writers have put into building a profitable brand with an enormous, dedicated readership". On October 29, following the memo, staffers filled the site's front page with non-sports stories that had been among the site's most popular in the past; by that afternoon, interim editor-in-chief Barry Petchesky had been fired for "not sticking to sports."

As a result of Petchesky's firing, at least 10 employees participated in a mass resignation on October 30. Among those who left were Ley, writers Albert Burneko, Kelsey McKinney, Patrick Redford, Lauren Theisen, Chris Thompson, and Laura Wagner. Moskovitz also announced her departure, though she had given her two weeks' notice the week prior. Comments on the site were subsequently disabled as well. The GMG union posted a statement saying: "Today, a number of our colleagues at Deadspin resigned from their positions. From the outset, CEO Jim Spanfeller has worked to undermine a successful site by curtailing its most well-read coverage because it makes him personally uncomfortable. This is not what journalism looks like, and this is not what editorial independence looks like. 'Stick to sports' is and always been a thinly veiled euphemism for 'don't speak truth to power.' In addition to being bad business, Spanfeller's actions are morally reprehensible." On October 31, Magary and Dan McQuade announced their departures. By November 1, the entire staff of nearly 20 writers and editors had announced their resignations or already departed. U.S. Senator Bernie Sanders expressed his support for the editorial staff, tweeting, "I stand with the former @Deadspin workers who decided not to bow to the greed of private equity vultures like @JimSpanfeller. This is the kind of greed that is destroying journalism across the country, and together we are going to take them on".

Maidment resigned from G/O Media on November 5, 2019, stating that it was the "right moment" to "pursue an entrepreneurial opportunity".

On January 10, 2020, G/O Media announced its decision to move Deadspin operations from New York City to Chicago, where it would operate as part of The Onion.

On January 31, 2020, Ley and several other former writers established Unnamed Temporary Sports Blog, an interim site sponsored by Dashlane that operated exclusively over Super Bowl LIV weekend. The site reopened for the week of April 20, sponsored by a cannabis oil company. In July 2020, they subsequently announced a new subscription-based sports and culture website, Defector.

The first new content posted to the Deadspin site following the resignations appeared on March 13, 2020, as new editor-in-chief Jim Rich announced that the website was building a new team. New articles began publishing earlier than planned due to the COVID-19 pandemic.

Reporting
Deadspin broke the story of NFL quarterback Brett Favre's alleged sexual misconduct toward journalist Jenn Sterger.

Deadspin also broke the story of Sarah Phillips, a reporter hired by ESPN who lied about her identity and credentials to staffers in order to gain employment.

In 2013, Deadspin broke the news that the reported September 2012 death of the girlfriend of Notre Dame All-American linebacker Manti Te'o, which Te'o had said inspired him during the 2012 season, was apparently a hoax. Deadspin found no evidence that the girlfriend had ever existed, much less died. A 2022 documentary, Untold: The Girlfriend Who Didn't Exist, features former staffers Timothy Burke and Jack Dickey speaking about the methods Deadspin used in exposing the hoax.

Deadspin received attention for "buying" a vote for the Baseball Hall of Fame election in 2013. The site announced in late November 2013 that it had acquired a vote from a BBWAA writer which was "purchased" not through a cash payment to the writer, but instead to a charity of the writer's choice. On January 8, after the Hall of Fame voting was announced, Deadspin revealed that its voter was Miami Herald sportswriter Dan Le Batard. Le Batard was heavily criticized by fellow sportswriters for "selling" his vote. The BBWAA permanently revoked his Hall of Fame voting privileges and suspended his membership for one year.

In 2014, Deadspin provided coverage of the Gamergate controversy, "expos[ing] a shocking view of sexism and harassment in the gaming industry to the wider public", according to Salon.

On October 15, 2014, Deadspin published an article which alleged that Cory Gardner, the Republican who ran for the U.S. Senate in Colorado, had faked his high school football career. Later that day, Gardner tweeted photographic evidence of himself in his football uniform as a teenager, and the main source of the story said the report mischaracterized his comments. In response, Deadspin published an article entitled: "How Deadspin Fucked Up The Cory Gardner Story", stating: "we're sorry and embarrassed", it was "shitty" of them to have wronged Gardner, and "the only thing for us to do now is to eat shit."

After Deadspin posted an article asking readers to post proof of Ted Cruz playing basketball, Cruz responded by jokingly tweeting a picture of Duke University star Grayson Allen, which then prompted Deadspin to reply with "Go eat shit."

In July 2017, Deadspin sparked controversy when in response to Senator John McCain's brain cancer diagnosis, Deadspins Twitter account tweeted that the website did not want to "hear another fucking word about John McCain unless he dies or does something useful for once."

In March 2018, The Concourse posted a video showcasing versions of a controversial "journalistic responsibility" promo being produced by television stations owned by Sinclair Broadcast Group, which helped bring mainstream attention to them.

Deadspins former last post each evening (before the October staff resignations), called DUAN ("Deadspin Up All Night"), was infamous for its occasionally viral and usually wildly diverse commentaries.

Under the new staff, the site has occasionally drawn controversy for the quality of its reporting and editing. In 2021, critics claimed the site mishandled reporting related to a clash between Rachel Nichols and Maria Taylor at ESPN.

Later that year, the site was criticized for calling ESPN anchor Sage Steele "the Black Candace Owens." Owens, a conservative commentator, is Black, while Steele is biracial.

In 2022, the site published a story criticizing San Francisco 49ers offensive coordinator Mike McDaniel as "another young, white guy." McDaniel has spoken at length about growing up biracial. After the article's publication, an editor's note was appended to the piece and a tweet promoting the article was deleted, but none of the copy was changed.

See also
Defector Media

References

External links

Gawker Media
American sport websites
Internet properties established in 2005
2005 establishments in the United States
Former Univision Communications subsidiaries